The 2014 San Marino and Rimini Riviera motorcycle Grand Prix was the thirteenth round of the 2014 Grand Prix motorcycle racing season. It was held at the Misano World Circuit Marco Simoncelli in Misano Adriatico on 14 September 2014.

In the premier class, Valentino Rossi took the first non-Honda win of the season, and his first victory since the 2013 Dutch TT. He finished ahead of teammate Jorge Lorenzo, and Dani Pedrosa finished in third place. The victory pushed him past the 5000 career points total, the first and so far only rider to achieve this feat. Marc Márquez crashed while battling for the race lead with Rossi; he remounted and – with a last-lap retirement for Aleix Espargaró – was able to score one championship point.

In the support categories, Moto2 championship leader Esteve Rabat took his seventh victory of 2014 – and third in succession – leading home teammate Mika Kallio for a 1–2 for the Marc VDS Racing Team, while the podium was completed by Johann Zarco. Just as in the other two classes, Estrella Galicia 0,0 achieved a 1–2 finish with riders Álex Rins and Álex Márquez; the pair were split by 0.042 seconds at the line, with Rins prevailing for his second win of 2014.

Classification

MotoGP

Moto2

Moto3

Notes

Championship standings after the race (MotoGP)
Below are the standings for the top five riders and constructors after round thirteen has concluded.

Riders' Championship standings

Constructors' Championship standings

 Note: Only the top five positions are included for both sets of standings.

References

2014 MotoGP race reports
San Marino Motorcycle Grand Prix
San Marino and Rimini Riviera motorcycle Grand Prix
San Marino and Rimini Riviera motorcycle Grand Prix